8 East Broad Street is a building on Capitol Square in Downtown Columbus, Ohio. Built in 1906, it was the tallest building in the city until the LeVeque Tower was built in 1927. The architect was Frank Packard. Presently, it is a residential building, housing condominiums in a development called "8 on the Square".

See also
List of tallest buildings in Columbus
 The Newsboy

References

External links
 

Residential skyscrapers in Columbus, Ohio
Buildings in downtown Columbus, Ohio
Commercial buildings completed in 1906
Frank Packard buildings
1906 establishments in Ohio
Broad Street (Columbus, Ohio)